Elsie S. Kanza is a Tanzanian Economist. She has served in various positions in the Ministry of Finance and Central Bank of Tanzania, including becoming a Personal Assistant to His Excellency Jakaya Mrisho Kikwete of the United Republic of Tanzania and also his Economic Advisor. She joined the World Economic Forum in 2011 and has been engaged in changing the narrative of the African economy. Elsie was named as one of Pan-Africa's continent leading women 2020 by Forbes.

Early life and education 
Elsie S. Kanza was born and raised in Kenya by Tanzanian parents. She started her education in Kenya before proceeding to the United States of America and graduated with a bachelor's degree from the United States international university- Africa in Business Administration and later on graduated with a master's degree in Finance from the University of Strathclyde, United Kingdom and an MA in Development Economics, Center for Development Economics, Williams College, USA.

Career 
Between 2002 and 2006, Elsie served in various positions in the Ministry of Finance and Central Bank of Tanzania and proceeded to become the Personal Assistant and Economic Advisor to His Excellency Jakaya Mrisho Kikwete of the United Republic of Tanzania till 2011 when she joined the World Economic Forum and has since been working to change the narrative of Africa. In 2014, Elsie became the Head of Africa, and member Executive Committee, World Economic Forum.

Awards 
Elsie Kanza has been recognised from different bodies for her contribution to the Economic sector; the recognition includes:

 Archbishop Desmond Tutu Leadership Fellow, 2008
 Young Global Leader, World Economic Forum, 2011
 Nominee, Rising Talents Program, Women's Forum for the Economy and Society, 2011
 20 Youngest Powerful Women in Africa, Forbes Africa, 2011
 50 Influential Africans in The World, Pan-African magazine, Jeune Afrique, 2014
 Africa's 50 Most Powerful Women, Forbes Africa, 2020

References 

Kenyan economists
Williams College alumni
Tanzanian economists
Living people
Year of birth missing (living people)